Lichwin may refer to:
 Lichwin, Lesser Poland Voivodeship
 Lichwin, Greater Poland Voivodeship